Mirjana Milenković (born 14 March 1985) is a former Montenegrin handball goalkeeper who plays for the Montenegrin national team.

Club career
Milenković started to play handball in Serbian club Radnički from Belgrade. In 2003, she joined Knjaz Miloš. In 2006, she joined Budućnost. In 2007 Milenković won Serbian Championship trophy and in 2008 and 2009 two Montenegrin Championship and Montenegrin Cup trophies.

From season 2011/2012 Milenković is playing for 2011 Spanish champions and EHF Champions League runners-up SD Itxako.

Trophies
Croatian Championship
Gold: 2015, 2016
Croatian Cup
Gold: 2015, 2016
Spanish Supercup
Gold: 2011/2012
Women's Regional Handball League
Silver: 2008/2009
Montenegrin Championship
Gold: 2007/2008 and 2008/2009
Silver: 2009/2010 and 2010/2011
Montenegrin Cup
Gold: 2007/2008 and 2008/2009
Silver: 2009/2010 and 2010/2011
Serbian Championship
Gold: 2006/2007

References

Sportspeople from Kruševac
1985 births
Living people
Serbian female handball players
Montenegrin female handball players
Montenegrin expatriate sportspeople in Spain
Montenegrin expatriate sportspeople in Croatia
Montenegrin expatriate sportspeople in Germany
Montenegrin people of Serbian descent
Mediterranean Games silver medalists for Serbia
Competitors at the 2005 Mediterranean Games
Mediterranean Games medalists in handball
RK Podravka Koprivnica players